Justice Huluvadi G. Ramesh (born 20 May 1957) is the second seniormost Judge at the Madras High Court in India since April 2016. He briefly officiated as the Acting Chief Justice of the court from February 2017 till the appointment of Indira Banerjee as Chief Justice in April 2017. He was transferred to the High Court of Madhya Pradesh, Principal Seat at Jabalpur and assumed charge on 15.11.2018.

Career
Ramesh started off as an advocate in March 1981. Initially, he used to practise in the courts at Mysore and Bangalore districts. He became a District Judge in Karnataka in February 1993 and was promoted to be an Additional Judge at the High Court of Karnataka in September 2004. Ramesh was transferred to Allahabad High Court in February 2015. He alleged a conspiracy behind the same during his farewell address. In 2016, he was brought to Chennai.

Notable judgements
As a judge at the Karnataka High Court in July 2008, Ramesh determined that the Bangalore Development Authority cannot acquire privately-owned lands for industrial purposes. He termed such an action to be illegal, unconstitutional and "nothing but an exercise of power by the State." This was in response to more than 220 petitions by residents of 12 villages from Begur, Sarjapura, Varthur, Konappana Agrahara etc.
In January 2015, a single judge Karnataka HC bench headed by Ramesh expressed displeasure at the Government of Karnataka's amendment to the Motor Vehicles Rules which sought to levy a lifetime tax on owners of automobiles registered outside Karnataka if they remain in the state for more than 30 days. The state was deemed to have not followed the necessary procedure, curtailing the freedom of movement guaranteed by the Constitution and contrary to the parent Motor Vehicles Act, 1988. In an interim order, the judge noted,"The [transport] department does nothing to keep the roads in good condition but is interested in collecting tax."
 A Division Bench of the Madras High Court made up of Justices Ramesh and M. V. Muralidaran held in October 2016 that Annamalai University is not a state university and as such, its Syndicate is empowered to decide the fee structure for the university.
 In March 2017, the First Bench of Madras HC consisting of Ramesh and R. M. T. Teekaa Raman JJ. ruled that the appointment of law officers of the government is a prerogative of the State as long as they are done as per the Supreme Court of India's guidelines.

References

1957 births
21st-century Indian judges
Judges of the Karnataka High Court
Living people
Judges of the Madras High Court
Judges of the Allahabad High Court
20th-century Indian lawyers